Charon is a fictional villain appearing in American comic books published by Marvel Comics. The character made his sole appearance in the 1993 X-Factor Annual #8.

Fictional character biography

Early life 
The real identity of Charon is Charlie Ronalds. As a young boy, Charlie witnessed his parents' death at the hands of a mutant (widely assumed to be Random). Enraged, Charlie flung himself at the mutant, threatening to kill him. The mutant spared Charlie because he had "never killed a kid before" and would rather not start. The mutant disappeared immediately afterwards. Charlie found himself orphaned, with all his relatives refusing to take him in. It would not be until much later that Charlie learned the reason that his relatives preferred to distance themselves from his mother. Charlie was raised in different foster homes and became a very bitter teenager with behavioral problems and a hatred of mutants, whom he blamed for his parents' death. The only teenager at his high school that he managed to make friends with at all was Guido Carosella, who later became the X-Factor member "Strong Guy". However, the friendship frayed immediately when Charlie discovered that Guido was a mutant. Dramatically, Guido was hit by a school bus and began to mutate. Enraged that his only friend turned out to be a mutant, Charlie picked up a huge rock and prepared to attack Guido with it. The plan backfired, however, as Guido violently spasmed, hitting Charlie in the process with the rock. Charlie ended up in the hospital, where he became interested in the occult after hearing nurses using a Ouija board next door. He recovered from his injury, but sustained a slight limp requiring him to use a cane for the rest of his life.

Adulthood and Confrontation with X-Factor 
Charlie spent much of his adult life studying the occult arts and eventually made a deal with a being known as 'Cloot', a known demon of the Marvel Universe. According to the terms of the deal, Charlie Ronalds would be granted superhuman abilities to attack the members of X-Factor. In return, the Devil requested their souls. Charlie would function as the devil's Charon, ferrying souls to the underworld.

Unfortunately, Charon's attempt to kill off the X-Factor team was unsuccessful. As he fought against the X-Factor, Strong Guy began to feel that he knew who Charon actually was. When he looked into Charon's eyes, he said, "Charlie...Is that you?" to which Charon replied, "Yes, I'm going to just kill you!"

Realizing that Charon had no intention of honoring his promise of souls, the Devil promptly arrived at the scene and swallowed Charon, telling him that he would be reunited with his parents in hell. It was then that he revealed to Charon that his mother was a hussy and his father her manager.

After the dramatic scene, Strong Guy stated that he "thought he knew" who Charon was, but he was not positive.

References

External links
 

Marvel Comics supervillains